Moskorzyn may refer to the following places in Poland:
Moskorzyn, Lower Silesian Voivodeship (south-west Poland)
Moskorzyn, West Pomeranian Voivodeship (north-west Poland)